Horabagrus nigricollaris is a species of catfish endemic to India. It is also known as 
the "Black collared catfish".  It is found only in the Chalakudy River in Kerala, India. This species is an inhabitant of hill streams.

Description
H. nigricollaris is sleeker in body shape than H. brachysoma and can reach a length of  TL. This species is less yellow than H. brachysoma and the black markings extend over the neck, forming a "black collar" (hence the scientific name).

References

Horabagridae
Catfish of Asia
Endemic fauna of India
Freshwater fish of India
Environment of Kerala
Endangered fish
Endangered fauna of Asia
Taxa named by Rohan Pethiyagoda
Taxa named by Maurice Kottelat
Fish described in 1994